Siguirini  is a town and sub-prefecture in the Siguiri Prefecture in the Kankan Region of northern Guinea. As of 2014, the population in Siguirini was 54,953.

References

Sub-prefectures of the Kankan Region